39 Combat Engineer Regiment (39 CER) was created on 3 May 2008 and amalgamated all the independent field engineer squadrons of the 39 Canadian Brigade Group in British Columbia.

39 CER is part of 3rd Canadian Division's (formerly LFWA's) 39 Canadian Brigade Group (39 CBG).

Sub-units
When the regiment was formed, it combined the existing independent field engineer squadrons and made them sub-units of 39 CER.
6 Engineer Squadron (North Vancouver)
44 Engineer Squadron (Trail, British Columbia & Cranbrook, British Columbia)
54 Engineer Squadron (Chilliwack)

Cadets
There are four Royal Canadian Army Cadets units spread across southern part of British Columbia which are affiliated to the 39 Combat Engineer Regiment. Cadets are not soldiers, nor are they expected to become soldiers; they are part of an organization dedicated to developing citizenship and leadership among young men and women aged 12 to 18 years of age with a military flavour, and are not required to join the Canadian Forces at any time.

Cadet units affiliated with the 39 CER combat units receive some support and are entitled to wear traditional regimental accoutrements on their uniforms at the corps expense.

References

Order of precedence

See also

 Military history of Canada
 History of the Canadian Army
 Canadian Forces
 List of armouries in Canada

Engineer regiments of Canada
Military units and formations established in 2008